Sivaram may refer to:

 Peketi Sivaram, South Indian actor and director
 Taraki Sivaram or Dharmeratnam Sivaram, Tamil journalist of Sri Lanka
 Sivaramapuram, village panchayat in Salur mandal of Vizianagaram district in Andhra Pradesh, India